Detlev Lauscher (30 September 1952 – 15 January 2010) was a German footballer who played as a striker during the 1970s and 1980s. He was born in Übach-Palenberg, North Rhine-Westphalia.

Lauscher played five seasons for 1. FC Köln in the German first division, helping the club finish as runners-up in the league and cup during 1973.

Lauscher died in January 2010 of heart failure.

References

External links
 
 

1952 births
2010 deaths
People from Heinsberg (district)
Sportspeople from Cologne (region)
German footballers
1. FC Köln players
FC Basel players
FC Luzern players
Grasshopper Club Zürich players
Association football forwards
Bundesliga players
Footballers from North Rhine-Westphalia
20th-century German people